Ubiquitin-conjugating enzyme E2 A is a protein that in humans is encoded by the UBE2A gene.

The modification of proteins with ubiquitin is an important cellular mechanism for targeting abnormal or short-lived proteins for degradation. Ubiquitination involves at least three classes of enzymes: ubiquitin-activating enzymes, or E1s, ubiquitin-conjugating enzymes, or E2s, and ubiquitin-protein ligases, or E3s. This gene encodes a member of the E2 ubiquitin-conjugating enzyme family. This enzyme is required for post-replicative DNA damage repair. Multiple alternatively spliced transcript variants have been found for this gene and they encode distinct isoforms.

Interactions 

UBE2A has been shown to interact with RAD18 and P53.

Clinical

Mutations in this gene have been associated with X-linked intellectual disability type Nascimento, also known as Nascimento syndrome. This syndrome is characterized by moderate to severe intellectual disability, dysmorphic facial features, seizures, speech impairment, motor delay, micropenis, and skin abnormalities.

References

Further reading